is the fifth single by Japanese entertainer Miho Nakayama. Written by Takashi Matsumoto and Kazuo Zaitsu, the single was released on May 16, 1986, by King Records.

Background and release
"Close Up" marked Nakayama's first collaboration with composer Kazuo Zaitsu and arranger Masaaki Ōmura; Matsumoto, Zaitsu, and Ōmura previously worked together on songs for Seiko Matsuda.

"Close Up" peaked at No. 4 on Oricon's weekly singles chart and sold over 128,000 copies.

Track listing

Charts
Weekly charts

Year-end charts

References

External links

1986 singles
1986 songs
Japanese-language songs
Miho Nakayama songs
Songs with lyrics by Takashi Matsumoto (lyricist)
King Records (Japan) singles